The Campana Brothers, consisting of Humberto Campana (born 1953) and Fernando Campana (1961–2022) are Brazilian furniture designers.

They stated that Lina Bo Bardi and Oscar Niemeyer were some of the big names who had a concrete influence on them.

In 1984 they co-founded Estudio Campana, which became recognised for its furniture design and intriguing pieces - such as the Vermelha (1993) and Favela (1998) chairs. In 1998, Estudio Campana debuted their first international show with the German lighting designer Ingo Maurer, "Project 66", which was curated by Paola Antonelli at the Museum of Modern Art in New York. In later years, the studio expanded its repertoire to the areas of architecture, landscaping, scenography, fashion, among others.

In fashion, Estudio Campana signed a collection for Brazilian jewelers H. Stern (2001). For the last fifteen years they have collaborated with Melissa to create footwear and accessories.

Artistic partnerships include the creation of the costumes for “Virtually There” ballet hosted by Performa Visionaries at Mana Contemporary in New Jersey (2006), sets and costumes for the Marseille National Ballet ‘Metamorphose’ show (2007) and the scenography of the ‘Peter and the Wolf’ musical, presented at the Guggenheim Museum in New York (2008).

Estudio Campana has been the recipient of many important awards, including Order of the Arts and Letters, Paris (2013); Design Miami Designer of the Year (2008); George Nelson Design Interior Awards, Interios Magazine USA (1999).

Fernando Campana died on 16 November 2022, at the age of 61.

Solo exhibitions
Bildmuseet, Umeå University, Sweden, 2 November 2014 – 2 February 2015.

Permanent collections
The Art Institute, Chicago, USA
Association Jacqueline Vodoz e Bruno Danese, Milan, Italy
Carnegie Museum of Art, Pittsburgh, USA
Centre Pompidou, Paris, France
Cooper-Hewitt Museum, New York, USA
The Corning Museum of Glass, Corning, USA
Dallas Museum of Art, Dallas, USA
Denver Art Museum, Denver, USA
Design Museum, Gent, Belgium
The Design Museum, London, UK
Don Edelman Foundation, Switzerland
Edson Queiroz Foundation, Fortaleza, Brazil
High Museum of Art, Atlanta, USA
Houston Museum of Fine Art, Houston, USA
Indianapolis Museum of Art, Indianapolis, USA
The Israel Museum, Jerusalem, Israel
Manchester City Galleries, Manchester, UK
The Metropolitan Museum of Art, New York, USA
Minneapolis Institute of Art, Minneapolis, USA
Musée des Arts Décoratifs, Paris, France
Musée de Design et D'Arts Appliqués Contemporain, Lausanne, Switzerland
Musée d’Orsay, Paris France
Museu do Design e da Moda, Francisco Capelo Collection, Lisbon, Portugal
Museum of Arts and Crafts, Hamburg, Germany
Museum of Modern Art, New York, USA 
Museum of Fine Arts, Montreal, Canada
Museum of Modern Art, São Paulo, Brazil
Museum of Arts and Design, New York, USA
Museum of Glass, Shanghai, China
National Foundation for Contemporary Art (FNAC), Paris, France
National Gallery of Victoria, Melbourne, Australia 
Palm Springs Art Museum, Palm Springs, USA
Philadelphia Museum of Modern Art, Philadelphia, USA
Pinakothek Der Moderne, Munich, Germany
San Francisco Museum of Modern Art, San Francisco, USA
Speed Art Museum, Louisville, USA
Stedelijk Museum, s-Hertogenbosch, Holland
The Tel Aviv Museum of Art, Tel Aviv, Israel
Trapholt Museum, Kolding, Denmark
Vitra Design Museum, Weil am Rhein, Germany

Bibliography
 Irmãos Campana, Stephan Hamel, Emanuela N. Mino, Max Perlingeiro, Multiarte; Edição: 1st edition, 2018 | 
 Campana Brothers: Complete Works (So Far), Darrin Alfred, Deyan Sudjic, Li Edelkoort, et al., Rizzoli and Albion Gallery, 2010 | 
 Tropical Modern: The Designs of Fernando and Humberto Campana, Mel Byars, ed., et al., New York: Acanthus Press, 1998 |

References

External links

Official site
Campana Brothers interview (in Portuguese)
Campana Brothers profile (in Portuguese)
Campana Brothers furniture designs
 

Brazilian furniture designers